The orange-brown Atlantic tree-rat or red-nosed tree-rat (Phyllomys brasiliensis), is a spiny rat species found in Brazil.

References

Phyllomys
Mammals described in 1840